Umm al-Tuyour is a town in northwestern Syria, administratively part of the Latakia Governorate, located north of Latakia on the Mediterranean coast. Nearby localities include Al-Shamiyah and Burj Islam to the south, Ras al-Basit and al-Badrusiyah to the north. According to the Syria Central Bureau of Statistics, Umm al-Tuyour had a population of 1,101 in the 2004 census. Its inhabitants are predominantly of Turkmen origin.

References

Populated places in Latakia District
Populated coastal places in Syria
Alawite communities in Syria